Xianjing may refer to
Xianjing, Zhuzhou, township in Zhuzhou County, Zhuzhou City, Hunan, China
Xiānjìng, the place where Xian ("fairies" or "immortals") reside in Chinese mythology
Xiànjǐng or "snare", an element in the Chinese board game Jungle

People with the given name
Princess Xianjing (1085–1115), a daughter of Emperor Shenzong of Song
Lü Xianjing (born 1998), Chinese cyclist

See also
Xinjiang, a provincial-level autonomous region of China
Xinjing (disambiguation)